Tizocic  or Tizocicatzin  usually known in English as Tizoc, was the seventh tlatoani of Tenochtitlan. His name means, "He who makes sacrifices" or "He who does penance." Either Tizoc or his successor Ahuitzotl was the first tlatoani of Tenochtitlan to assume the title Huey Tlatoani ("supreme tlatoani") to make their superiority over the other cities in the Triple Alliance (Aztec Empire) clear.

Biography

Family 
Tizoc was a son of the princess Atotoztli II and her cousin, prince Tezozomoc. He was a grandson of Emperors Moctezuma I and Itzcoatl. He was a descendant of the King Cuauhtototzin.

He was successor of his brother Axayacatl and was succeeded by his other brother, Ahuitzotl; his sister was the Queen Chalchiuhnenetzin, married to Moquihuix, tlatoani of Tlatelōlco. He was an uncle of Emperors Cuauhtémoc, Moctezuma II and Cuitláhuac and grandfather of Diego de San Francisco Tehuetzquititzin.

Reign 
Most sources agree that Tizoc took power in 1481 (the Aztec year "2 House"), succeeding his older brother. Although Tizoc's reign was relatively short, he began the rebuilding of the Great Pyramid of Tenochtitlan (a task completed by his younger brother in 1487), and also put down a rebellion of the Matlatzincan peoples of the Toluca Valley.

Death 
Tizoc died in 1486, though it is still somewhat unclear how. Some sources suggest that he was poisoned, others that he fell to illness.

In popular culture
 The Obsidian and Blood series by Aliette de Bodard is set in the last year of the reign of Axayacatl and the first years of the reign of Tizoc, with their youngest brother Ahuitzotl appearing as a primary character. The second book, Harbinger of the Storm is primarily set during the election of Tizoc as tlatoani after the death of Axayacatl.

See also

 List of Tenochtitlan rulers
 Stone of Tizoc

Notes

References

External links

 

 

Year of birth missing
1486 deaths
Tenochca tlatoque
15th-century monarchs in North America
15th-century murdered monarchs
15th century in the Aztec civilization
Deaths by poisoning